Brooklyn Rugby Football Club, is a Rugby Union team founded in 2007 and based in Brooklyn, New York.  The team competes in the Empire Geographic Union Division III, and is a member of USA Rugby.

History

Founding
Brooklyn Rugby Football Club was founded in 2007 by a small group of former college and men's club players looking to build a competitive and community-oriented club in the borough of Brooklyn.  At the time, New York City was serviced by several clubs within the 5 boroughs including NYAC Rugby, Old Blue, The Village Lions, Landsdown Rugby, Rockaway, and Old Maroon.  There were, however, no rugby teams in the city's largest borough of Brooklyn.

In the Fall of 2007, the core group of players, who would start the club, played that season for the NY Americans (who later merged with another club to form the Kingston Mad Dogs). Since the travel to games for the NY Americans was becoming cost-prohibitive, the core members got together and started a club in Brooklyn, which would later be named Brooklyn Rugby Football Club.

In the early days, the club was fully sponsored by Barons Brewing Company of Sydney, Australia and, in line with this sponsorship, was named the Brooklyn Barons Rugby Football Club. Barons eventually pulled their sponsorship in light of the economic downturn in 2008 and the club re-branded itself as Brooklyn Rugby Football Club, the name of the club to this day.

The club started its history in the Metropolitan Rugby Football Union Division III, which is the fourth tier of United States Rugby.

Founding Players and Coaches
  Mike Haynes (Coach)
  Justin Knight
  Keith Weiss
  Geoffrey Gordon
  Brian Benito
  Joshua Magnas

Merging With the Women's Club

In 2014 the Brooklyn Rugby Football Club and the Brooklyn Women's Rugby Football Club, two separate clubs throughout their histories, merged and became one club with one governing body.  The club known as Brooklyn Rugby Football Club now provides rugby playing opportunities to both men and women in the Brooklyn area and field competitive teams in both genders.

Mike Haynes Era
Brooklyn Rugby started its first league season with coach and founder Michael Haynes at the helm and Captain Geoffrey Gordon leading the team on the field. Fellow core founding members Justin Knight, Keyth Weiss, and Joshua Magnas helped fill out the inaugural team.

In 2008, Brooklyn Rugby finished in 2nd place in their inaugural Fall season. The team ultimately lost in the Final to eventual NRU champions Danbury Rugby Club, who went on to be promoted to Division II. The team showed a high level of competitiveness in their first league season and were an early favorite to win the championship in 2009.

In the spring of 2009, Brooklyn Rugby secured its first two pieces of hardware, winning both the Four Leaf 15's Tournament hosted by the Village Lions and the North Bay Grey Ghost Cup hosted by North Bay rugby.

In the 2009 campaign, Brooklyn Rugby lost two games in the regular season but secured a playoff berth thanks to a last-minute penalty goal against Hudson Valley. In the playoffs, Brooklyn Rugby avenged their regular season loss to Rockaway Rugby Football Club on Rockaway's home field. Brooklyn eventually lost in the Met Union Final to eventual NRU champions North Jersey RFC. This was Brooklyn's second year in the final in as many Fall seasons, an excellent record for a new club.

Undefeated Season

Brooklyn Rugby came into the 2010 season as one of the favorites to finish in first place. On October 21, 2010, Brooklyn Rugby completed an undefeated season with a 59-0 home win over The Rockland Rogues.  The undefeated regular season included a 15-10 away win over rival Rockaway, however, Rockaway were to overturn this result in the D3 Championship final 23-14. Brooklyn still earned the 5th seed in the NRU playoffs which meant that Brooklyn had to travel to Boston to play MIT in the first round. After a back and forth game Brooklyn was able to win a tough game on the road 15-14.  The result gave Brooklyn their first NRU playoff victory and granted them entry to the Northeast Final Four, along with rival Rockaway, Saratoga and Brooklyn's semi-final opponent the Syracuse Chargers.  Brooklyn would lose its semi-final encounter  with Syracuse but would come out strong in the consolation game against Saratoga to secure 3rd place in the NRU, Brooklyn best finish in its history.

2nd Mike Haynes Era
2011 saw the return of founding coach Mike Haynes to the team as the head coach with the retirement of Tri Do.  Brooklyn's 2011 spring season saw a competitive schedule with some positive results against top tier opponents but were denied promotion by the union.  Brooklyn Rugby Football club were informed that they would remain in DIII for the upcoming Fall 2011 season.

In August 2011 it was announced that Brooklyn Rugby FC's new main sponsor would be the Black Grouse, a brand in the family of Scotch Wiskey produced by the Edrington Group, makers of The Famous Grouse.  Brooklyn Rugby's crest was changed to reflect this new relationship as the rugby ball in the upper let hand quadrant of the crest was changed to an image of a Grouse.

2011 saw Brooklyn Rugby have another successful regular season campaign finishing the season with 5 victories and 1 loss, including a home win over top ranked Montclair RFC.  For the 2nd straight year Brooklyn rugby would host a home semifinal against Suffolk RFC, who had beaten Brooklyn for the first time in their history in the regular season.  The Semi-Final was played in a winter Noreaster but the players fought through the freezing rain a snow to play the game, which was won by Brooklyn 10-0.  Brooklyn would meet Montclair in the final, Brooklyn's fourth in as many years.  Brooklyn were out matched on the day by a clinical and physical Montclair side and lost the final 41-10.

Empire GU and Jeff Dincher Era

2012 Saw Brooklyn Rugby take the field in a more competitive and restructured Division III under the newly formed Empire GU.  The season was the first in charge for new head coach Jeff Dincher.  Brooklyn RFC dropped their first two games of the season.  A loss to Old Blue in the season opener and a lopsided loss to yearly league rival Suffolk at their home field.  Brooklyn RFC would bounce back though with successive wins over Rockland RFC and Old Maroon.  Brooklyn RFC's next match was a tough test against newly relegated side North Jersey.  The team comported themselves well with a 12-12 draw at Nojo's home turf.  Brooklyn would finish the season with a tough road draw to a much improved Hudson Valley side and a lop sided win over city rival Gotham Knights.  The season was a tough one in the standings for Brooklyn RFC as they finished 4th and missed the playoffs.

Division restructure and Daniel Newcombe Era

After a series of friendlies in the Spring season of 2013, Jeff Dincher stepped down as coach of Brooklyn Rugby. His departure coincided with a number of changes being made to the Empire GU's league structure, particularly in the lower divisions. The changes that affected Brooklyn the most were new teams (formerly from D2 of the Empire GU) entering the division. Furthermore, league matches were now to be contested across both the fall and spring seasons - previously all league activity took place in the fall. In the absence of a new coach, player and former captain Daniel Newcombe stepped in as coach of the team, while continuing his position as a hooker for the club. Newcombe was joined on the coaching staff by former player Jason Maschi, joining as the attacking play coach, and former coach Jeff Dincher, who joined as the club's defensive play coach.

Brooklyn's inaugural season in the restructured Division III South started promisingly with away wins over Montauk and Connecticut Yankees. These successive victories were followed by a tough  7 - 14 loss to league leaders Lansdowne RFC, an unfortunate 10 - 7 away defeat to local rivals Rockaway, a lopsided 38 - 5 to second-placed Old Blue and a tough away visit to Danbury that resulted in a score of 36 - 17 to the home team. Galvanized by this string of losses, Brooklyn finished out the first half of their 2013/14 league season with a decisive 50 - 0 victory over Hudson Valley. The league season restarted in March 2014 with a 22 - 0 win over Suffolk in extremely adverse weather conditions. A closely fought contest against NoJo followed, with a final score of 13 - 10 to Brooklyn. This win was notable due to it being the first time the club had beaten NoJo in regular league play. Brooklyn's final result of the 2013-14 league season was a 21 - 17 win over Bayonne, meaning the club finished the second half of their league season undefeated. Overall, Brooklyn finished 4th out of 11 in the division, an improvement on the previous year given the increased size of the division and tougher competition.

Season History

Empire GU League Results

Met Union/Empire GU Playoff Results

Northeast Rugby Union Playoff Results

Management

Club Personnel

Board of Directors: Frank Morgera, Alpons Dizon, Justin MacDonald, Mark O'Donnell, Josiah Ruhland
Club Chairman: Toby Tornay
Men's 1st Team Coach: Daniel Newcombe
Men's 1st Team Captain: Justin MacDonald
Women's 1st Team Coach: Greg Mull
Women's 1st Team Captain: Max Soo
Men's 7's Czar Alpons Dizon
Men's 7's Team Captain: Vacant
Women's 7's Team Coach: Greg Mull
Women's 7's Team Captain: Max Soo

Leadership History

Club Chairmen

Coaching History

Captains

Current squad

Men's Club

Honors

Empire Geographic Union/Metropolitan Rugby Football Union

Division III Championship

Playoff Runner-up (4) - 2008, 2009, 2010, 2011

Regular Season Titles (1) - 2010

Northeast Rugby Football Union

Division III

Playoff Berths - 2008, 2009, 2010

Tournaments

4 Leaf 15's Tournament NYC

Participant - 2009, 2011

Social Division Champions - 2009

North Bay Grey Ghost Cup - Maryland

Participant - 2009, 2010

Tournament Champions - 2009

Long Island Mother's Day Tournament

Participant - 2007, 2008, 2011

Runners Up (1) - 2011

CAN-AMS Rugby Tournament

Participant - 2011-2013

Consolation Champions - 2013

International Tours

Turks and Caicos 2012:

Results:

TCIRFC President's XV 10 - Brooklyn Rugby 5

TCIRFC First XV 27 - Brooklyn Rugby 0

Club Awards

Hall of Fame

Keith Weiss Cup

Awarded by the President to the club member who has, through his on field and off field contributions, given the most to the club as whole.  The award is named after one of the club's first presidents and founding member of the club, Keyth Weiss.

Michael Haynes Cup
Awarded by the coaching staff to the player who has, through his dedication in practice, on field performance and leadership, contributed most to the team on the field.  The award is named after the club's first coach who helped to found the club, Mike Haynes.

Women's Coaches Cup
Awarded by the coaching staff to the player who has, through her dedication in practice, on field performance and leadership, contributed most to the team on the field.

Justin Knight Cup
Awarded by the players to the teammate who they believe has, through his dedication in practice, on field performance and leadership, contributed the most to the team on the field.  The award is named after club founder and legendary player, Justin Knight.

Women's Players Cup
Awarded by the players to the teammate who they believe has, through her dedication in practice, on field performance and leadership, contributed the most to the team on the field.

Rookie of the Year
Awarded to the Player who has contributed most to the team on the field in his or her first year with the club.

Men's Club

Women's Club

Sevens Player of The Year
Awarded to the Player who has contributed most to Brooklyn Rugby's Sevens team

Men's 7's Team

Women's 7's Team

Josh Magnus Award
Awarded to the player who, through his or her dedication in training and performance on the field, has shown the most improvement in his skills and play or has made the biggest impact coming back from injury.

Men's Club

Women's Club

References

External links 
 Brooklyn RFC History
 Men's D3 NYC Standings & Schedule 2015 |Men's Standings

 Official Club Website
 Official Union Website
 USA Rugby Website

Sports teams in New York City
Rugby clubs established in 2007
Rugby union teams in New York City
Rugby union teams in New York (state)
Sports in Brooklyn